"Nu Nu" is the second single of Chicago house-musc artist Lidell Townsell,which featured duo M.T.F. The song was released from his 1992 Mercury/PolyGram Records album release Harmony.

Chart performance
"Nu Nu" reached #1 on the US Hot Dance Music/Maxi Singles chart and #2 on the US Hot Dance Music/Club Play chart. It was #26 on the Billboard Hot 100 and #44 on the US Hot Hip-Hop & R&B Singles.

FannyPack version
New York's hip hop/electronica group FannyPack covered the song, renaming it "Nu Nu (Yeah Yeah)," in 2005. The Double J & Haze Extended Mix of this version appeared on the soundtrack of the 2006 film "Stick It" and on the soundtrack of the 2009 film "Fired Up!"

This version was used in promos by American television network NBC on its weeknight talk show Late Night with Jimmy Fallon during 2010.

Austin Mahone/Pitbull Mmm Yeah sampled version
The 2014 song “Mmm Yeah,” sung by Austin Mahone and featuring Pitbull, heavily samples the lyrics and verses from “Nu Nu” and most notably samples the chorus.

References

1992 singles
1992 songs
Mercury Records singles